The 1938–39 season was Blackpool F.C.'s 38th season (35th consecutive) in the Football League. They competed in the 22-team Division One, then the top tier of English football, finishing fifteenth.

Willie Buchan was the club's top scorer for the second consecutive season, this time jointly with Jock Dodds, with ten goals each in all competitions.

Table

Notes

References

Blackpool
Blackpool F.C. seasons